The Catoctin Wildlife Preserve is a  zoo and wildlife preserve ( are accessible to the public) located on Maryland Route 806 in Thurmont, Maryland, United States.

The preserve features safari truck rides that let visitors touch and feed large herbivores in a wooded setting.

History 
Animals have been exhibited at this location since 1933, when it was known as Jungleland Snake Farm. Owner Gordon Gaver operated the small attraction (approx. 5 acres) until his death in 1964. The facility was then purchased by Richard and Mary Anne Hahn and reopened in 1966. The Hahn family maintained ownership and gradually enlarged the park.

Animals

Islands area

Madagascar area

Australia area

Safari ride

Eurasia area
Amur leopard
Meerkat
Green anaconda
Reticulated python
Yellow anaconda
Argentine boa
Abdim's stork
African sacred ibis
African spurred tortoise
Red-crowned crane
Goldfish
Koi
African pygmy goat
Suri alpaca
Jacob sheep

Latin America area

Africa area

North America area

Notes

External links

Zoos in Maryland
Buildings and structures in Frederick County, Maryland
Tourist attractions in Frederick County, Maryland